Rashkan (also Romanized as Rashkān and Rashakān; also known as Rīshakān) is a village in Dul Rural District, in the Central District of Urmia County, West Azerbaijan Province, Iran. At the 2006 census, its population was 434, in 132 families.

References 

Populated places in Urmia County